The Cultural Manifesto (Republican spelling , EYD: , abbreviated ) was a declaration by a group of Indonesian writers and intellectuals in late 1963. The Cultural Manifesto was initiated by HB Jassin, Trisno Sumardjo, Wiratmo Soekito, Zaini, Bokor Hutasuhut, Gunawan Mohamad, A. Bastari Asnin, Bur Rasuanto, Soe Hok Djin, DS Moeljanto, Ras Siregar, Hartojo Andangdjaja, Sjahwil, Djufri Tanissan, Binsar Sitompul, Gerson Poyk, Taufiq Ismail, M. Saribi, Poernawan Tjondronegoro, Ekana Siswojo, Nashar and Boen S. Oemarjati. The group that constituted the Cultural Manifesto was in ideological contrast to Lekra (Lembaga Kebudayaan Rakyat). Members of the Lekra movement nicknamed the Cultural Manifesto "Manikebu," a humorous abbreviation that in English means "Buffalo Sperm."

History
The manuscript of the Cultural Manifesto was completed by Wiratmo Soekito on August 17, 1963, at 04.00WIB. Then the manuscript can be accepted by Goenawan and Bokor Hutasuhut as the material that will be submitted to the discussion on August 23, 1963, at Jalan Raden Saleh 19, Jakarta. Once approved, the text is then copied and distributed to some of the artists to be first as the ideological basis.
With located at Jalan Raden Saleh 19 Jakarta, on August 23, promptly at 11.00WIB held a meeting to discuss the cultural manifesto . This meeting was attended by thirteen persons consisting of artists and cultural circles . The thirteenth man was HB Jassin, Trisno Sumardjo, Wiratmo Soekito, Zaini, Bokor Hutasuhut, Gunawan Mohamad, A. Bastari Asnin, Bur Rasuanto, Soe Hok Djin, DS Moeljanto, Ras Siregar, Sjahwil, and Djufri Tanissan .

Then the drafting committee hearing that ended at 02.30WIB decided that manifestations of Culture is divided into three sections . The third part was translated into Cultural Manifesto, Manifesto Explanation of Culture, and Literature Pancasila . The result of this formula will be taken to the full hearing which will be held on August 24, 1963 .

On August 24, 1963, hearing held by the Cultural Manifesto endorsement Goenawan chairperson and secretary Bokor Hutasuhut . The trial was held in Jakarta Jalan Raden Saleh 19 and started at 13.00WIB . On behalf of the committee, Bokor Hutasuhut drafting committee report on the work that has set the Cultural Manifesto consists of three parts: Cultural Manifesto, Manifesto Explanation of Culture, and Literature Pancasila . Committee unanimously set a trial outcome Cultural Manifesto is irreversible and Cultural Manifesto is not a priori given birth cultural organizations . Then, the Cultural Manifesto published via News Republic newspaper in space "Forum " Literature and Culture 1, Th I, October 19, 1963, and No. Literature magazine . 9/10, Th III, 1963.

Manuscript 

We are the artists and intellectuals of Indonesia has announced a Cultural Manifesto which states the establishment, political ideals and our national culture.

For us, culture is the struggle to improve the human condition . We do not prefer one over the cultural sector but also other sectors . Each sector together to fight the culture in accordance with his nature.

In implementing the National Culture, we tried to create with the seriousness that honestly as a struggle to maintain and develop our self dignity as a nation of Indonesia in the community of nations.

Pancasila is the philosophy of our culture.

Jakarta, August 17, 1963

References

Humanism
Indonesian culture
Manifestos
1963 documents
1963 in Indonesia